The 1944 United States presidential election in North Carolina took place on November 7, 1944, as part of the 1944 United States presidential election. North Carolina voters chose 14 representatives, or electors, to the Electoral College, who voted for president and vice president.

North Carolina was won by incumbent President Franklin D. Roosevelt (D–New York), running with Senator Harry S. Truman, with 66.71 percent of the popular vote, against Governor Thomas E. Dewey (R–New York), running with Governor John Bricker, with 33.29% of the popular vote. , this is the last election in which the following counties voted for a Democratic presidential candidate: Catawba, Davidson and Henderson. It also remains the last time to date that North Carolina was carried by the Democrat in two consecutive elections.

Results

Results by county

References

North Carolina
1944
1944 North Carolina elections